American Airlines Flight 28 was a scheduled domestic passenger flight that crashed on October 23, 1942, in Chino Canyon near Palm Springs, California, United States, after being struck by a United States Army Air Forces B-34 bomber. The B-34 suffered only minor damage, and landed safely at the Army Airport of the Sixth Ferrying Command, Palm Springs.

All nine passengers and three crewmembers on board the twin-engine DC-3 perished in the crash and subsequent fire; neither of the two Army pilots aboard the B-34 was injured. The army pilot was later tried on manslaughter charges, but was found not guilty by a court martial trial board.

Casualties in the crash included Academy Award-winning Hollywood composer Ralph Rainger, who had written a number of hit songs including "I Wished on the Moon," "June in January," "Blue Hawaii," "Love in Bloom" (Jack Benny's signature song), and "Thanks for the Memory" (Bob Hope's signature song).

Aircraft 
American Airlines Flight 28 was served by a Douglas DC-3, registration NC16017, powered by two  Wright Cyclone engines and full-feathering propellers. It had been approved and certified by the Civil Aeronautics Board (CAB), and was rated to carry a maximum of twenty-one passengers and four crew. It was piloted by Captain Charles Fred Pedley, 42, who had flown for twelve years with American Airlines, and who had logged over 17,000 hours of flight time. The co-pilot was First Officer Louis Frederick Reppert, Jr., a 26-year-old pilot with 800 hours of flight time and six months' employment by the airline. The third crewmember was stewardess Estelle Frances Regan, age 27.

The Lockheed Ventura B-34 Lexington bomber, serial number 41-38116, was manufactured by the Lockheed Air Corporation and operated by the United States Army Air Forces. It was piloted by Lieutenant William Norman Wilson, 25, attached to the Air Transport Command and stationed at Long Beach, California. His copilot was Staff Sergeant Robert Reed Leicht, also 25, of the Sixth Ferrying Command, Army Air Forces, and also stationed at Long Beach.

Flight and crash 
Flight 28 departed from the Lockheed Air Terminal in Burbank, California, at 4:36 p.m. PDT (UTC−7) on October 23, 1942. At 4:26 p.m., the B-34 bomber departed from Long Beach en route to Palm Springs. Lieutenant Wilson proceeded to Riverside, circled twice near March Field, and continued toward the San Gorgonio Pass.

The DC-3 lost its rudder to the propeller from the B-34's right engine, along with portions of its tail. It fell from the sky in a flat spin and impacted a rocky ledge in Chino Canyon, below San Jacinto Peak, before crashing into the desert and exploding.

Lieutenant Wilson later testified at his court martial proceedings that he first realized that the two aircraft had collided when he heard a "noise and a wrenching of my ship up... to my left." He also testified that he noticed that his aircraft handled sluggishly and the right engine felt "rough." He was informed by his copilot that they had hit the airliner. The B-34 called the Palm Springs tower to notify them of the accident and then subsequently landed at Army Airport in Palm Springs.

The Burbank operator at the company station reported that he had picked up a message from Flight 28 at exactly 5:15 p.m., saying: "Flight 28 from Burbank... correction Burbank from Flight 28..." The radio operator was only able to distinguish the flight calling Burbank, and though he attempted to respond he received no answer from Flight 28. He then directed the message to the American Airlines Flight Superintendent at Burbank. The CAB determined that, as Flight 28 crashed at 5:15 p.m., it was possible that the pilots were attempting to report the collision.

Investigation 
Three separate investigations into the accident occurred: a coroner's inquest, a military investigation and court martial, and the official congressional investigation of the CAB. Each of the three investigations was independent of the others.

The coroner's inquest was the first investigation to be completed, occurring shortly after the crash. Its purpose was not to decide absolute culpability, but rather to determine exactly the manner of death of the involved individuals. During the inquest, both surviving Army pilots testified that they had seen the airliner, but that they had subsequently lost sight of it when their aircraft flew into smoke from a nearby forest fire.

CAB investigators arrived at the scene of the crash at midnight of October 23. The remnants of the aircraft were placed under military guard for the duration of the investigation. During the course of the investigation, it was learned that Lt. Wilson of the B-34 and First Officer Reppert of Flight 28 had trained together, and had met up the previous night and talked about their chances of meeting while in flight. Though they briefly discussed the possibility of signaling each other, they made no such plans to the effect. The B-34 copilot, Sergeant Leigh, told investigators that Wilson had confided that he'd like to fly close to the airliner and "thumb his nose at him." It was for this reason that the bomber circled twice around March Field in order to ensure that the aircraft would meet up during the flight to Palm Springs.

Subsequent depositions revealed that Lt. Wilson flew his B-34 level with the DC-3 and rocked his wings in greeting to First Officer Reppert. When Flight 28 did not respond in kind, the B-34 crossed over the airliner's line of flight and throttled back to allow the slower DC-3 to catch up. Wilson flew close to the airliner to attempt a second greeting but misjudged the distance between the aircraft, and when he tried to pull up, the B-34's right propeller sliced through the airliner's tail.

The CAB determined that the cause of the crash was:

Lt. Wilson faced manslaughter charges by the United States Army. During the course of the court martial proceedings, a number of military witnesses produced testimony that corroborated the findings of the CAB. However, one witness, Private Roy West, provided testimony in direct contradiction of the previous witnesses. According to Private West:

The CAB dismissed West's statement as unreliable, as when a plane's nose dips, the tail does not rise by such a significant amount as witnessed by West. However, the court martial trial board acquitted Lt. Wilson of blame in the accident.

The B-34 that collided with American Flight 28 was repaired and re-designated as an RB-34A-4 target tug. On August 5, 1943, the same RB-34, serial number 41-38116, suffered engine failure during a ferry flight and crashed into Wolf Hill near Smithfield, Rhode Island, killing all three crew members.

See also 

 List of accidents and incidents involving airliners in the United States
 American Airlines accidents and incidents
 1942 in aviation

References

External links
 Report of the Civil Aeronautics Board (PDF)
 
  (includes names of passengers and crew)
   (plaintext)
 
 

1942 in aviation
1942 in California
Accidents and incidents involving the Douglas DC-3
Accidents and incidents involving United States Air Force aircraft
Airliner accidents and incidents in California
Mid-air collisions
Mid-air collisions involving airliners
Mid-air collisions involving military aircraft
28
Aviation accidents and incidents in the United States in 1942
Death in Riverside County, California
Disasters in California
Events that led to courts-martial
October 1942 events